Hoogersmilde is a village in the Dutch province of Drenthe. It is a part of the municipality of Midden-Drenthe, and lies about 16 km southwest of Assen.

History 
The village was first mentioned in 1634 as Hooge Smilde, and means "high Smilde". In 1614, a large region of raised bog was bought by a group of Amsterdam merchant lead to Adriaan Pauw to excavate the peat. In 1634, Adriaan Pauw was made Heer of the Heerlijkheid Smilde in 1633. Hoogersmilde is the oldest settlement and was often referred to as Oude-Smilde.

The Heerlijkheid was dissolved in 1795, and the municipality of Smilde was created with neighbouring Smilde as a capital. The Dutch Reformed church was built in 1845. Hoogersmilde was home to 660 people in 1840.

The Zendstation Smilde is located in Hoogersmilde, it partially collapsed after a fire on 15 July 2011. The Blauwe Meer, an excavation lake, is situated south of Hoogersmilde.

Gallery

References

Midden-Drenthe
Populated places in Drenthe